Thomas Noble may refer to:

 Thomas Paterson Noble (1887–1959), Scottish surgeon
 Thomas Satterwhite Noble (1835–1907), American painter
 Thomas Noble (MP) (1656–1730), British politician
 T. Tertius Noble (1867–1953), English-born organist and composer in the United States
 Tommy Noble (1897–1966), British boxer